The 1921 Rock Island Independents season was their second in the National Football League. The team failed to improve on their previous record against league opponents of 6–2–2, winning only four games. They finished fifth in the league.

Schedule

Game in italics is against a non-NFL team.

Standings

References

Rock Island Independents seasons
Rock Island Independents
Rock Island Independents